The Milpulo were an indigenous Australian tribe of New South Wales. Very little information about them has been transmitted in early accounts of their region.

Country
It lay to the northwest of the Darling River from Wilcannia downstream, though extending no further than probably Tandou Lake.

People
The Milpulo appear to have been a back country people, living in the mallee and mulga scrublands, where water could be culled by digging down to their roots, and only coming in to the riverine area when conditions of drought were extreme. They gained a reputation for fierceness from tribes further south, who referred to them as milipulun, implying that they were regarded as "aggressive outsiders(strangers."

Social organisation
According to J. W. Boultbee the Milpulo had the following class system:
{| class="wikitable"
! Class !! colspan="2" | Totem
|-
| rowspan="6" | Mukwara
|-
| Bilyara || eagle-hawk
|-
| Turlta || kangaroo
|-
| Burkunia || bandicoot
|-
| Uleburri || duck
|-
| Karni || frilled-lizard
|-
| rowspan="8" | Kilpara
|-
| Kulthi || emu
|-
| Turru || carpet-snake
|-
| Namba || bone-fish
|-
| Birnal || iguana
|-
| Bauanya || padi-melon
|-
| Yerilpari || opossum
|-
| Muringa || wallaby
|-
|}

Mythology
Two myths which apparently belonged to the Milpulo. The first is an aetiological tale accounting for the creation of Lake Boolaboolka, the other recounts a tale concerning intertribal fighting near Albermarle.

Alternative names
 Milpulko
 Mailpurlgu
 Mamba

Notes

Citations

Sources

Aboriginal peoples of New South Wales